Le Kremlin-Bicêtre is a commune in the southern suburbs of Paris, France. It is one of the most densely populated municipalities in Europe.

Le Kremlin-Bicêtre is most famous as the location of the Bicêtre Hospital, where Superintendent Philippe Pinel is credited as being the first to introduce humane methods into the treatment of the mentally ill, in 1793. Its most notorious guest was the Marquis de Sade.

Name

The name has roots both in England and Russia. Le Kremlin-Bicêtre was originally a hamlet called simply Bicêtre and located within the commune of Gentilly. The name Bicêtre comes from the manor built there by John of Pontoise, Bishop of Winchester (England), in the end of the 13th century. The name of this Manor of Winchester was corrupted into Vinchestre, then Bichestre, and eventually Bicêtre. The Bicêtre Hospital was built starting in 1634 on the ruins of the manor.

In 1813 the Bicêtre Hospital acted as a major reception point for evacuated casualties of the Grande Armée from the French invasion of Russia. Veterans of the invasion of Russia used to gather in a tavern near Bicêtre Hospital. This tavern was soon renamed  ("At the Kremlin sergeant") in reference to the Moscow Kremlin where the veterans had camped.

Gradually the name Kremlin was used for the whole neighborhood around the Bicêtre Hospital, and appeared for the first time officially in an ordnance map of 1832. Later the names Kremlin and Bicêtre were joined together and became the official name of the area.

History

The commune of Le Kremlin-Bicêtre was created on 13 December 1896 by detaching its territory from the commune of Gentilly.

Population

Transport

Le Kremlin-Bicêtre is served by Le Kremlin-Bicêtre station on Paris Métro Line 7.

Education

Public primary and secondary schools:
 Five preschools: Benoît-Malon, Jean-Zay, Pauline-Kergomard, Robert-Desnos, Suzanne-Buisson
 Five elementary schools: Benoît-Malon A, Benoît-Malon B, Charles-Péguy, Pierre-Brossolette

Secondary schools:
Public junior high schools: Collège Jean-Perrin and Collège Albert-Cron 
Public senior high schools: Lycée intercommunal Darius-Milhaud and Lycée Pierre-Brossolette

There is one private elementary and junior high, Jeanne-d'Arc.

Le Kremlin-Bicêtre also has the computer science schools EPITA and EPITECH. The computer programming school Coding Academy, IONIS School of Technology and Management, the Web@cademie and the school E-Artsup are also located in the commune.

Notable residents

 Roger Caillois (1913–1978), writer, sociologist, and literary critic.
 Suzanne Flon actress and comedian, born in 1918 at Kremlin-Bicêtre.
 Kamelancien (aka Kamelanc'), rap artist of Moroccan origin, who debuted in 1993.
  (Émile Charles Jean Aldéric Lavialle) was an actor, who died 16 October 1965 in this town.
 Lazare Ponticelli, the last surviving French and Italian veteran of World War I, Resistance member and industrialist, died here in 2008.
 , seven-time French table tennis champion and creator of the Secrétin-Purkart Show, a humorous look at the sport broadcast on television.
 Jean-François Revel, intellectual, lived in this town during the latter part of his life, and he died here in April 2006.
 Farid Dms Debah is a director and producer. He received the Kremlin-Bicêtre City Honor Medal in 2004.
 Pierre Lasjaunias (1984-2008), anatomist, neuroradiologist, and interventional neuroradiology physician who worked at Bicêtre Hospital from 1983-2008, serving as Director of Neuroradiology and Director of the Head and Neck Division among other positions. Dr. Lasjaunias is known for his contributions in advancing the treatment of Vein of Galen Malformations, and inspiring countless students of neuroradiology.

Gallery

See also
Communes of the Val-de-Marne department
Fort de Bicêtre

References

External links

  Kremlin-Bicêtre official website

Communes of Val-de-Marne